Tanner Fritz (born August 20, 1991) is a Canadian professional ice hockey forward for the Hartford Wolf Pack of the American Hockey League (AHL).

Playing career

Amateur
Fritz played for the Grande Prairie Storm of the Alberta Junior Hockey League for four years. While playing with the Storm, he graduated from Grande Prairie St. Joseph High School in 2009 and was named the 2011 AJHL MVP after leading the team in points and ranking fourth in the league. He then attended Ohio State University, and played for the Ohio State Buckeyes men's ice hockey team. Fritz stated that he became interested in Ohio State after his cousin, Daymen Rycroft, began his freshman season there.

While majoring in sport industry, Fritz played 34 games in his freshman season. He scored his first collegiate goal on November 5, 2011, in a 2–0 win over Alabama-Huntsville. In his sophomore year, Fritz played in 40 games and set new career highs with 37 points. He was named to the Second Team All-CCHA, 2013 CCHA scoring champion, Ohio State Scholar-Athlete, and  Academic All-Big Ten.

In his junior year, despite missing five games due to an injury, Fritz ranked third on team in points and fourth in the conference for assists. At the conclusion of the season, Fritz was again named an Ohio State Scholar-Athlete and was selected for the Academic All-Big Ten and 2014 Big Ten Sportsmanship Award.

Prior to his senior year, Fritz participated in the Chicago Blackhawks 2014 Prospect Camp. However, he returned to Ohio State and served as the team's captain for the 2014–15 season.

Professional
Fritz ended his collegiate career by signing with the Missouri Mavericks of the ECHL for the 2015–16 season. However, he tried out for the Bridgeport Sound Tigers of the American Hockey League (AHL) during the 2015–16 season, and made the team. In 43 games for the Mavericks, Fritz scored ten goals and 33 points. In 19 games for the Sound Tigers, he had two goals and 12 points.

Fritz returned exclusively to the Sound Tigers for the 2016-17 season. He upped his previous season's totals by scoring 19 goals and 23 assists in 63 games. On March 29, 2017, Fritz signed a one-year, two-way contract with the Sound Tigers' National Hockey League (NHL) affiliate, the New York Islanders. The contract was set to begin in the 2017-18 season. The Islanders recalled Fritz for the first time on January 1, 2018. and he recorded his first NHL goal on February 19 against the Minnesota Wild.

On May 31, 2019, the Islanders re-signed Fritz to a two-year contract extension.

Following his sixth season within the Islanders organization, Fritz left as a free agent and on September 15, 2021, was signed a one-year contract with the Hartford Wolf Pack of the AHL, the primary affiliate of the New York Rangers.

Career statistics

References

External links
 

1991 births
Living people
Bridgeport Sound Tigers players
Canadian ice hockey centres
Grande Prairie Storm players
Hartford Wolf Pack players
Ice hockey people from Alberta
Missouri Mavericks players
New York Islanders players
Ohio State Buckeyes men's ice hockey players
People from Grande Prairie
Undrafted National Hockey League players